Surochów  (Surokhiv, initially  Sukhoriv) is a village in the administrative district of Gmina Jarosław, within Jarosław County, Subcarpathian Voivodeship, in south-eastern Poland.

People
Kasimir Felix Badeni (1846–1909), Austrian politician and Polish noble from Galicia
Aleksander Fredro (1793–1876), Polish poet, playwright and author

References

Villages in Jarosław County